KRKH is an active rock formatted broadcast radio station licensed to Wailea-Makena, Hawaii, serving Maui County, Hawaii.  KRKH is owned and operated by HHawaii Media. The station is an affiliate of the syndicated Pink Floyd program "Floydian Slip."

References

External links
K-Rock 97-3 Online

RKH